Love Songs is a compilation album of romantic songs by American alto saxophonist David Sanborn and was released in 1995 through Warner Bros. Records. The album peaked at No. 11 on December 2, 1995 on Billboard's Contemporary Jazz Albums.

This album sampler includes romantic tracks from albums released in 1976-1988 such as "Lisa", "Straight To The Heart", and the 1985 version of "The Water Is Wide" with vocalist Linda Ronstadt.

Track listing

References

David Sanborn albums
Albums produced by Peter Asher
Albums produced by Phil Ramone
Albums produced by Tommy LiPuma
Albums produced by Matt Pierson
Albums produced by Michael Colina
Albums produced by Robert Margouleff
1995 compilation albums
Warner Records compilation albums